In Moldova, the standard time is Eastern European Time (EET; UTC+02:00). Daylight saving time, which moves one hour ahead to UTC+03:00 is observed from the last Sunday in March to the last Sunday in October.

IANA time zone database 
In the IANA time zone database, Moldova is given one zone in the file zone.tab – Europe/Chisinau (named after Chișinău, the capital of Moldova, but without the diacritics). Data for Moldova directly from zone.tab of the IANA time zone database; columns marked with * are the columns from zone.tab itself:

See also 
Time in Europe
List of time zones by country
List of time zones by UTC offset

References

External links 
Current time in Moldova at Time.is